Imed Meniaoui (born 19 April 1983) is a Tunisian football striker.

References

1983 births
Living people
Tunisian footballers
Tunisia international footballers
ES Zarzis players
LPS Tozeur players
ES Métlaoui players
Club Africain players
Association football forwards
Tunisian Ligue Professionnelle 1 players
People from Tozeur